Ashley Aubra Jones (born September 3, 1976) is an American actress. She is known for her roles in soap operas as Megan Dennison on The Young and the Restless and as Bridget Forrester on The Bold and the Beautiful. She also had a recurring role as Daphne on the HBO drama series True Blood in 2009.

Early life
Jones was born in Memphis, Tennessee on September 3, 1976. Shawn Jones, her father, is a minister. The family lived in Tennessee for five years before her father took a job preaching in Texas. Jones has one brother named Zach and one sister named Toni, named after their aunt who saved their mother’s life by donating blood. At the age of five, she filmed her first commercial. At the age of nine, Jones starred in several theatre productions in the Actors Theatre of Houston including The Women, Ah, Wilderness!, and Neil Simon's Brighton Beach Memoirs. At the age of 12, she was in The Chalk Garden by Enid Bagnold.

Career
Jones rose to fame on the long-running CBS soap opera The Young and the Restless, playing Megan Dennison from 1997 to 2000, and again in 2001. She received two Daytime Emmy Award nominations for her role on The Young and the Restless. She played Dr. Bridget Forrester on The Bold and the Beautiful from December 2004 to February 2012 and again in 2013. She has made brief return appearances several times since 2013. 

Jones starred as Daphne on the second season of HBO's True Blood in 2009. Jones also has starred in the number of Lifetime movies, like A Teacher's Crime (2008), Dead At 17 (2008), Secrets from Her Past (2011), House (2011), A Sister's Revenge (2013), and The Secret Sex Life of a Single Mom (2014) and "Saving My Daughter" (2021). In late January 2016, Jones was confirmed to be cast as Parker Forsyth on General Hospital.

Personal life
Jones was married to actor Noah Nelson, the son of actor Craig T. Nelson, from August 17, 2002, to May 2009. She previously dated former B&B co-star Jack Wagner.

In November 2015, Jones' engagement to IT infrastructure manager, Joel Henricks was announced. On February 1, 2016, it was announced that Jones and Henricks were married in a small courthouse wedding. In March 2016, it was announced that Jones and Henricks were expecting a son together. In May. 2016, Jones and Henricks welcomed their son. Henricks already has a son, Huck, from a previous relationship. The actress was arrested on August 22, 2019, on a felony domestic violence charge, an LAPD media relations officer confirmed to PEOPLE. She was released one day later on $50,000 bond. In September 2019, Jones filed for divorce from Henricks. She made a series of domestic allegations against Henricks and was granted a temporary restraining order against him.  They share joint custody of their minor child.

Filmography

Film

Television

Awards and nominations

References

External links

 
 
 

1976 births
20th-century American actresses
21st-century American actresses
Actresses from Houston
Actresses from Memphis, Tennessee
American child actresses
American soap opera actresses
American television actresses
Living people
Pepperdine University alumni